Aranyak is a 2021 Indian Hindi-language Netflix crime thriller web series created by Charudutt Acharya and Rohan Sippy, directed by Vinay Waikul, and starring Raveena Tandon, Parambrata Chatterjee, Ashutosh Rana, Taneesha Joshi, Anna Ador, Zakir Hussain, and Meghna Malik.

Synopsis
In the fictional Himachal Pradesh town of Sironah, two morally upright officers, both battling their own inner demons, try to find the person responsible for the alleged rape and murder of a teenage girl who had ostensibly come to spend the holidays with her mother, a foreign national, in the picturesque town.

Release
Aranyak was released on Netflix on 10 December 2021.

Reception
Ronak Kotecha of The Times of India reviewed the series, stating: "Raveena & Parambrata's nuanced chemistry powers this whodunit"

Anuj Kumar of The Hindu wrote: "Aranyak season one review: Raveena Tandon aces Netflix whodunit, aided by the fantastic writing"

Shubham Kulkarni of Koimoi gave the series two stars, saying, "Raveena Tandon is back on the screen and still carries the effortless screen presence. But the character given to her suffers a lot of confusion."

Shubhra Gupta of The Indian Express stated, "Raveena Tandon is unafraid of appearing uncouth and crude, and is able to toughen up and soften when the occasion demands, even if the unsophisticated accent slips."

Outlook reviewed the series positively, writing, "Netflix's recently released drama thriller has all those typical elements one would find in a drama thriller, yet the writers have left a few loops open, to keep the viewers guessing if a second season might be on the cards as well."

Saraswati Datar of The News Minute called it "an engaging crime thriller".

Praising the performance of the cast, NDTV stated that "Ashutosh Rana, as a former cop determined to prove himself all over again, is splendidly low-key and yet high on impact. Zakir Hussain, Meghna Malik, Indraneil Sengupta and Breshna Khan, too, make noteworthy contributions on the acting front."

Cast and characters
 Raveena Tandon as Kasturi Dogra
 Parambrata Chatterjee as Angad Malik
 Ashutosh Rana as Mahadev Dogra
 Taneesha Joshi as Nutan Dogra
 Anna Ador as Aimee Baptiste
 Zakir Hussain as Kuber Manhas
 Meghna Malik as Jagdamba Dumal
 Indraneil Sengupta as Ravi Parashar
 Breshna Khan as Julie Baptiste
 Priyanka Sethi as Nilima Manhas

References

External links
 
 

Indian drama web series
Indian television series
Hindi-language Netflix original programming